Lotgenoten (Dutch for Counterparts) is a Dutch feature film, directed by Stephan Brenninkmeijer.

The film was made during the crowd sourced project Entertainment Experience with Paul Verhoeven. Lotgenoten was picked up by Benelux Film Distributors for Dutch nationwide release in March 2013.

Plot
Remco Albrecht, CEO of Albrecht Construct and part-time womanizer, reluctantly celebrates his 65th birthday when his life takes a turn for the worse. His once mistress shows up uninvited at his party and turns out to be pregnant, his rebellious children try everything to humiliate him at his party and his business partners are scheming behind his back to sell the company. Yet in the end, nothing is what it seems.

References

External links
 Official website

2013 films
Dutch drama films
2010s Dutch-language films